Bhojpur may refer to the following places:

India
 Bhojpur, Bihar
Bhojpur, Madhya Pradesh
 Bhojpur Stupas
 Bhojpur, Orissa
 Bhojpur Dharampur, a town and a nagar panchayat in Moradabad district of Uttar Pradesh
 Bhojpur (Assembly constituency)
 Bhojpuri region, a region in northern India where Bhojpuri language is spoken
 Bhojpur district, India, in Bhojpur region of Bihar state
 Bhojpur, Raebareli, a village in Raebareli district of Uttar Pradesh

Nepal
 Bhojpur District, Nepal, a district in Province No. 1, Nepal
 Bhojpur Municipality, a municipality in Bhojpur district of Nepal
 Bhojpur, Nepal, a neighborhood in Bhojpur Municipality

See also
 Bhojpuri (disambiguation)